Piskor is a surname. Notable people with the name include:

Davor Piškor (born 1982), Croatian footballer
Ed Piskor (born 1982), American comics artist
Michal Piskoř, (born 1967) Czech ice hockey player
Pierre Piskor (born 1984), French footballer
Roman Piskor (1917–1981), American football tackle 
Tadeusz Piskor (1889–1951), Polish Army general

See also
 

Czech-language surnames